The Minister of Customs was a position in the Cabinet of the Government of Canada responsible for the administration of customs revenue collection in Canada. This position was originally created by Statute 31 Vict., c. 43, and assented to on 22 May 1868.

From 3 December 1892, the Minister's position was abolished in favour of a Controller of Customs position, which was treated as part of the Ministry, but not part of the formal Cabinet. A similar change was also made to the Minister of Inland Revenue portfolio at that time. The Controller of Customs became part of the Cabinet on 24 December 1895, when John Fisher Wood joined the Privy Council.

The position once again became known as Minister of Customs with the passage of Statute 60-61 Vict., c. 18, which was given royal assent on 29 June 1897. (The same legislation also brought back the title of Minister of Inland Revenue.)

On 18 May 1918, the offices of Minister of Customs and Minister of Inland Revenue were combined into the Minister of Customs and Inland Revenue, as mandated by Order in Council.

Ministers and Controllers of Customs

References

Sources 
 Privy Council Office (Canada) -  Guide to Canadian Ministries since Confederation
 Old and Sold: Canada - Constitution And Parliamentary

Federal departments and agencies of Canada
Canadian ministers